The women's 200 metre freestyle event at the 2020 Summer Olympics was held from 26 to 28 July 2021 at the Tokyo Aquatics Centre. It was the event's fourteenth consecutive appearance, having been held at every edition since 1968.

Summary 
After a victory in the 400 m freestyle two days earlier, Australia's Ariarne Titmus pulled away from the field to capture the Olympic mid-distance freestyle crown and her second individual gold at these Games. Hanging with the leaders at the 150-metre turn, Titmus overtook Hong Kong's Siobhán Haughey in the final 25 m to establish a new Olympic Record of 1:53.50. Despite leading for the first three laps, Haughey was unable to catch a fast-finishing Titmus near the wall, winning silver in an Asian record of 1:53.92. Haughey's silver also marked Hong Kong's first ever Olympic medal in swimming. Meanwhile, Canada's Penny Oleksiak moved up from one of the outside lanes to take home the bronze in 1:54.70.

China's Yang Junxuang was second at the 150-metre turn though ultimately slipped off the podium to fourth in 1:55.01. The U.S.' defending Olympic champion Katie Ledecky finished fifth with a time of 1:55.21 while the Czech Republic's Barbora Seemanova recorded a national record of 1:55.45 to touch sixth. Italy's world-record holder Federica Pellegrini grabbed the penultimate spot of the top eight in 1:55.91 with Titmus' teammate Madison Wilson (1:56.39) trailing her to round out the field.

The medals for competition were presented by Giovanni Malagò, IOC member, and the gifts were presented by Donald Rukare, FINA Bureau Member.

Records
Prior to this competition, the existing world and Olympic records were as follows.

The following record was established during the competition:

Qualification

 
The Olympic Qualifying Time for the event is 1:57.28. Up to two swimmers per National Olympic Committee (NOC) can automatically qualify by swimming that time at an approved qualification event. The Olympic Selection Time is 2:00.80. Up to one swimmer per NOC meeting that time is eligible for selection, allocated by world ranking until the maximum quota for all swimming events is reached. NOCs without a female swimmer qualified in any event can also use their universality place.

Competition format

The competition consisted of three rounds: heats, semifinals, and a final. The swimmers with the best 16 times in the heats advance to the semifinals. The swimmers with the best 8 times in the semifinals advance to the final. Swim-offs are used as necessary to break ties for advancement to the next round.

Schedule
All times are Japan Standard Time (UTC+9)

Results

Heats
The swimmers with the top 16 times, regardless of heat, advance to the semifinals.

Semifinals
The swimmers with the best 8 times, regardless of heat, advanced to the final.

Final

References

Women's 00200 metre freestyle
Olympics
Women's events at the 2020 Summer Olympics
2021 in women's swimming